Scyliorhinotheca is an extinct genus of cartilaginous fish first described in 2012 from the state of Washington. It contains only one species, Scyliorhinotheca goederti.

References

Eocene sharks
Scyliorhinidae
Fossils of the United States
Fossil taxa described in 2012